Patrizia Caraveo (born April 8, 1954, Milan) is an Italian astrophysicist.

Biography
Patrizia Caraveo graduated in Physics at the physics department of the University of Milan in 1977. After a period abroad, in 2002 she began working at the Institute of Cosmic Physics in Milan as Director of Research, and is currently Director of the institute. She has worked on several international space missions dedicated to particle physics, starting with the European mission Cos-B. She is currently involved in the European INTEGRAL mission, the NASA Swift mission, the Italian AGILE mission and the NASA Fermi mission, all of which are now in orbit and fully operational.

Her main field of interest is the behavior of neutron stars at different wavelengths. She was among the first to understand the fundamental role of neutron stars in particle physics. After years of efforts to explain the first unidentified pulsar radio emission, she identified the neutron star Geminga. She has developed a multi-wavelength strategy for the identification of galactic gamma-ray sources. She is a member of the International Astronomical Union. Since 1997, Caraveo has worked as an adjunct professor at the University of Pavia. She is married to the physicist Giovanni Bignami.

Research
Her first ten years' research were devoted almost entirely to the analysis and interpretation of data collected from gamma astronomy satellite Cos-B, and the beginning of the study of X-ray astronomy with the analysis of data collected by the Einstein Observatory and EXOSAT. In the following period, her interests widened to include all of multi-wavelength astronomy, especially optical astronomy and interpretation of its results.

Since her thesis work, Caraveo has taken part in the development of multi-wavelength observations that led to the discovery and understanding of the neutron star Geminga. This required the use of multiple optical instruments both on the ground and in space. She has used observations from satellites such as SAS-2, HEAO-1, Cos-B, Einstein, EXOSAT, Ginga, ROSAT, Egret, EUVE, Hubble, Hipparcos, XMM-Newton, and Chandra, in addition to ground-based telescopes such as the Very Large Array. The results of Geminga have opened a new chapter in astrophysics: the study of unidentified gamma-ray sources. This is now one of the main topics of research by several groups around the world.

Her identification of Geminga, the first neutron star to show no radio emissions, has opened the way for a more general study of the phenomenology and number of optical pulsars. Caraveo and her team are dedicated to studying the color, motions, and distances of neutron stars, along with the relationship between neutron stars and young supernova remnants. With the use of parallax with Geminga,  Caraveo accomplished the first optical measurement of the distance to an isolated neutron star. The correlation of data from Hipparcos with images from the Hubble Space Telescope to determine the absolute position of the faint optical counterpart of Geminga, was chosen by the European Space Agency as one of the 30 success stories presented at the Ministerial Conference in May 1999 (see ESA BR 147).

Caraveo's continuous improvement to the techniques of analysis of data from the Hubble Space Telescope allowed the measurement of the proper motion of the Crab pulsar and then proper motion and parallax of the pulsar in the constellation of Sails, yielding a result much closer than she had expected. In both cases there was a significant alignment between the direction of the proper motion vector and the X-ray jets revealed by these two neutron stars. This alignment has profound implications for the physics of the explosion of supernovae.

Using the telescope XMM-Newton, Caraveo has contributed to the first direct measurement of the magnetic field of an isolated neutron star, thanks to the discovery of cyclotron absorption lines in the data source 1E1207-59, a neutron star at the center of a supernova with no radio counterpart.

The high sensitivity of XMM-Newton has also resulted in two major findings on Geminga. The star, as it moves with supersonic speed in the interstellar medium, generates a shock wave that produces a train of X-rays. This allows scientists to probe both the density of the interstellar medium and the energy of the accelerated electrons from the source. The result, with Caraveo as first author, was published in Science, on September 5, 2003 (which devoted its cover to XMM-Newton), and has received substantial coverage in the Italian and world press. Observations from Chandra also revealed a tail that follows the pulsar, perfectly aligned with its proper motion. It could be the PWN (pulsar wind nebula) of Geminga. While several other pulsars have comet tails of this type, the combination between the large structures revealed by XMM-Newton and the new data from Chandra is unprecedented.

The data accumulated by XMM-Newton enabled Caraveo to take a significant step in understanding Geminga through studying the spectrum of the source as a function of phase. This suggests that some observations of the star are due to a small hot spot which rotates with the star. The result, with Caraveo as first author, published in Science on July 16, 2004, is of great importance for the understanding of the physics of neutron stars, as the technique developed for Geminga is applicable to other neutron stars.

Geminga is not the only example of a pulsar without radio emission. The satellite Fermi has discovered dozens of others, demonstrating that the predictions made on the basis of the phenomenology of Geminga were fundamentally correct.

Following the publication of the catalog of gamma sources revealed by Fermi, Caraveo coordinated a program centered on the study of unidentified gamma-ray sources. The purpose of the exercise is to find sources with the highest ratio of X-ray to optical emissions, one of the characteristic signs of neutron stars.

Coordination efforts

In addition to data analysis, Caraveo was responsible for the study and planning of new missions. She was part of the Astronomy Working Group of the European Space Agency and contributed to the study and selection of new missions.

After involvement in the spectrometer of INTEGRAL, Caraveo was part of the group proposing ESA's participation in the James Webb Space Telescope (then the New Generation Space Telescope) In parallel, Caraveo took part in the development of new high-energy astrophysics missions such as the AGILE mission of the Italian Space Agency and the Swift and GLAST missions of NASA, for which she holds the position of Co-Investigator.

Caraveo is also responsible for the contract the Italian Space Agency (ASI) signed for the financing of activities related to astrophysical mission GLAST (now Fermi) of NASA.

Within ASTRONET, Caraveo was co-chair of the panel dedicated to high-energy astrophysics.

Caraveo was vice-coordinator of the panel of Italy's aerospace National Operational Program (NOP).

She is currently responsible for the participation of INAF in the Cherenkov Telescope Array.

Awards
Caraveo shared the Bruno Rossi Prize of the American Astronomical Society with colleagues in 2007, 2011, and 2012 for work on the Swift, Fermi, and Agile projects.

She was awarded the Italian National Presidential Prize in 2009 for contributions to the understanding of the issue of high energy neutron stars.

In March 2014 she received the "Outstanding Achievement Award" from Women in Aerospace-Europe.

In June 2014 Thomson Reuters included her in the list of "Highly Cited Researchers" in the discipline "Space Science".

References

External links

Living people
1954 births
Italian astrophysicists